Allison R. Green (October 28, 1911 – March 26, 2005) was a Republican politician from Michigan who served in the Michigan House of Representatives, and as its Speaker during the 72nd Legislature. He was also appointed by Governor George Romney as Michigan's state treasurer in 1965, retiring from that position in 1978 as the longest-serving treasurer in Michigan history.

Green became interested and learned about politics and state government by reading the Michigan Manual, the biennial publication which lists information about Michigan's history, constitutions, government officials, and institutions.

Green was a member of the original Tuscola County Board of Education and served on the board of directors of the Kingston State Bank.

References

1911 births
2005 deaths
School board members in Michigan
Michigan Auditors General
Speakers of the Michigan House of Representatives
Republican Party members of the Michigan House of Representatives
State treasurers of Michigan
Central Michigan University alumni
People from Caro, Michigan
20th-century American politicians
People from Cass City, Michigan